Andreas Romar (born 4 September 1989 in Korsholm, Ostrobothnia) is a Finnish alpine skier. He represented Finland at the 2010 Winter Olympics in Vancouver.

World Cup Results

References

External links

1989 births
Living people
People from Korsholm
Finnish male alpine skiers
Olympic alpine skiers of Finland
Alpine skiers at the 2010 Winter Olympics
Alpine skiers at the 2018 Winter Olympics
Sportspeople from Ostrobothnia (region)
21st-century Finnish people